Buccipagoda is a genus of sea snails, marine gastropod molluscs in the family Buccinidae, the true whelks. It was first described in 1982 under the name Kapala by Winston Ponder with the name honouring the FRV Kapala, but the genus name had already been used. Hence, a replacement name was needed and given in 2010. The type species is Buccipagoda kengrahami (Ponder, 1982), formerly Kapala kengrahami.

The genus is endemic to Australia and found in the coastal waters of New South Wales, South Australia, Tasmania, and Victoria, on the continental slopes in mud and silt at depths of up to 457 m.

Species
Species within the genus Buccipagoda include:
Buccipagoda achilles 
Buccipagoda kengrahami 
Buccipagoda ponderi 
Buccipagoda bathybius  accepted as Sagenotriton bathybius 
Buccipagoda bonaespei  accepted as Sagenotriton bonaespei

References

External links

Buccinidae
Gastropod genera
Molluscs described in 1982
Taxa named by Winston Ponder